Epigraphy of Abkhazia comprises all the epigraphic monuments (inscriptions written on hard material) inside Abkhazia, Georgia. They are all in Georgian, Greek, Ottoman and Latin languages.
The number of the Georgian epigraphic monuments is more than 100 and they date from the 8th century AD. The Greek inscriptions are up to 22 and they mostly date before the 9th century AD. Out of the Ottoman Turkish inscriptions, the oldest one is from 1598.
Out of the Georgian inscriptions up to 15 ones mention the kings of Abkhazia. About 30 inscriptions are seen on icons from Bedia, Bichvinta, Tsebelda and Ilori churches.

According to their exterior sign known Georgian inscriptions can be divided into three groups: lapidary (about 50), mural (about 30) and embossed inscriptions (about 20).

List of the epigraphic monuments of Abkhazia

Georgian inscriptions

Greek inscriptions

Other inscriptions

Map of the Georgian Lapidary

External links

 Heritage of Georgia, Apkhazeti - short review, Tbilisi, 2018

References

Inscriptions by region
Georgian inscriptions
Culture of Abkhazia